Quayshawne Buckley (born August 25, 1991) is an American football defensive tackle who is currently a free agent. He played college football at Idaho.

Tampa Bay Buccaneers

Buckley was signed as an undrafted rookie on May 5, 2015.

Calgary Stampeders
Buckley was released on June 13, 2016.

References

External links
Tampa Bay Buccaneers bio
Idaho Vandals bio

Living people
American football defensive tackles
Tampa Bay Buccaneers players
People from Ontario, California
Sportspeople from San Bernardino County, California
1991 births
Idaho Vandals football players